The Fall is a 2006 adventure fantasy film directed and co-written by Tarsem Singh and starring Lee Pace, Catinca Untaru, and Justine Waddell. It is based on the screenplay of the 1981 Bulgarian film Yo Ho Ho by Valeri Petrov. Its costume design is by Eiko Ishioka. The film was released to theaters in America and the UK in 2008 and earned $3.7 million worldwide.

Plot
In 1915 Los Angeles, stuntman Roy Walker is hospitalized, bedridden and paralyzed (possibly permanently) after jumping off a bridge for a stunt in his first film. He meets Alexandria, a young Romanian-born patient in the hospital who is recovering from a broken arm, and begins to tell her a story about her namesake, Alexander the Great. Alexandria is told she has to leave, but Roy promises to tell her an epic tale if she returns the next day.

The next morning, as Roy spins his tale of fantasy, Alexandria's imagination brings his characters to life. Roy's tale is about five heroes: a silent Indian warrior, a muscular ex-slave named Otta Benga, an Italian explosives expert called Luigi, Charles Darwin and his pet monkey, Wallace, and a masked swashbuckling bandit. An evil ruler named Governor Odious has committed an offense against each of the five, and they all seek revenge. The heroes are later joined by a sixth hero, a mystic.

Alexandria vividly imagines her friends and people around her appearing as the characters in Roy's story. Although Roy develops affection for Alexandria, he also has an ulterior motive: to trick her into stealing morphine from the hospital pharmacy. Roy intends to use the morphine to commit suicide because the woman he loves has left him for the actor for whom he provided the stunt footage. However, Alexandria returns with only three pills. Roy asks what happened to the rest of the pills in the bottle, and Alexandria says she threw all but three of them down the toilet, having mistaken the "E" on the piece of paper Roy gave her for a "3". The stories become a collaborative tale to which Alexandria also contributes. Alexandria herself becomes a character: while Roy is the masked bandit, she is his daughter.

Roy talks Alexandria into stealing a bottle of morphine tablets locked in a fellow patient's cabinet, and then downs it all. He tells her she should leave after he takes them, but he knows she may not obey and may very well witness the death of the man she has come to view as her father. This does not come to pass, as the next morning Roy awakens from his sleep and realizes the pills were placebos and not actual morphine. Alexandria, desperate to help Roy, sneaks out of bed to the pharmacy. She climbs onto the cabinet but loses her footing, falls, and sustains a severe head injury. She receives surgery, after which she is visited by Roy, where he confesses his deception. He pleads with Alexandria to ask someone else to end the story, but she insists on hearing Roy's ending. Roy reluctantly begins the rest of the story.

The heroes die one by one, and it seems that Governor Odious will be triumphant. Alexandria becomes increasingly upset, but Roy insists that it's his story to tell. She declares that it is hers too and begs Roy to let the bandit live. Roy finally agrees, and the epic tale comes to an end; Governor Odious lays dying and the Bandit and his daughter are alive and together. In a final twist, Roy confronts the character representing his ex-girlfriend. She says that the story's pain and suffering were all part of a "test" of the Bandit's love for her. The Bandit rejects her and her manipulations at last.

With the story complete, Roy and Alexandria, along with the patients and staff of the hospital, watch a viewing of the finished film that Roy appeared in. With everyone laughing, only Roy's smile is broken in confusion when he sees that his jump has been edited out of the film.

Alexandria's arm eventually heals and she returns to the orange orchard where her family works. Her voice-over reveals that Roy has recovered and is now back at work again. As she talks, a montage of cuts from several of silent films' greatest and most dangerous stunts plays; she imagines all the stuntmen to be Roy.

Cast
 Lee Pace as Roy Walker / Black Bandit
 Catinca Untaru as Alexandria / Bandit's daughter
 Justine Waddell as Nurse Evelyn / Sister Evelyn
 Daniel Caltagirone as Sinclair / Governor Odious
 Marcus Wesley as Ice delivery man / Otta Benga
 Robin Smith as One-legged actor / Luigi 
 Jeetu Verma as Orange picker / Indian
 Kim Uylenbroek as Doctor / Alexander the Great
 Leo Bill as Orderly / Charles Darwin
 Emil Hoștină as Alexandria's father / Blue Bandit
 Julian Bleach as Mystic / Orange picker
 Ronald France as Otto (the "old man")
 Sean Gilder as Walt Purdy

Themes
The Fall is a self-reflexive film that deals primarily with the concept of storytelling. Roy Walker tells a story to Alexandria, who imagines it, but there is a discontinuity between what he describes and how she sees it. Each character brings their own life into their experiences of the story; Roy takes inspiration from the film that he was working on before his accident, and Alexandria populates his story with familiar sights from her own life. The intimidating X-Ray operator becomes an enemy soldier, the 'Indian' is seen by her as an immigrant co-worker from the orange groves, while Roy's dialogue makes it clear to the audience that he meant 'Indian' to mean a Native American man from the Western film he was involved in.

The Fall is also grounded in the film's historical period. Roy took inspiration for his story's bandits from early 20th century news; the controversy over credit for Charles Darwin's ideas in On the Origin of Species between Darwin and Alfred Russel Wallace, as well as Ota Benga's imprisonment in the Louisiana Purchase Exposition in St. Louis, Missouri were prominent news stories around the time period of the film's setting.

Production

According to the director's remarks on the DVD release of the film, Tarsem Singh largely financed the film with his own funds, determined to make the film according to his own vision, and paid members of the cast and crew on an equal basis rather than in more typical Hollywood fashion.

Singh's commentary indicates the film was made over a period of four years and incorporates footage shot in more than 20 countries, including India, Indonesia (Bali), Italy, France, Spain, Namibia, China (PRC), and numerous others, a few of which are not listed in the credits. Singh stressed the importance of on-location filming and lack of special effects in interviews because he found that modern techniques would not age well in comparison. He reportedly only took advertising jobs in places that he wanted to do location scouting for, and would fly out cast members to shoot scenes for the film using the same crew as he did for commercials. Singh's focus on striking visuals combined with his commitment against using special effects when shooting scenes of the blue city in Jodhpur, as he provided locals with blue paint to refresh the paint on their houses. This alternative to post-production effects resulted in the vibrant blue of the city in the film. Another location, the contemporary South African mental hospital which represents an early 20th-century Los Angeles hospital (the principal setting throughout the film) remained operational (in a separate wing) during filming, according to the DVD commentaries.

The DVD supplementary features reveal that actor Lee Pace remained in a bed for most of the early filming at the director's suggestion, convincing most of the crew that he was in fact unable to walk. The intention, Tarsem and Pace noted, was to maximize the realism of Roy's physical limitations in the eyes of Catinca Untaru, whose lines and reactions as the character Alexandria were largely unscripted, and so were young Catinca's spontaneous interactions with Pace's character. For example, Alexandria's misinterpreting the letter E as the number 3 in a note written by Roy came about from an accidental misreading by the 6-year-old actress during filming, which the director then realized he could adapt into a clever twist in the story.

To further the realism of young Catinca's performance, Tarsem had portions of the hospital scenes between Pace and his young co-star filmed through small holes in the hospital bed curtains, maximizing the youngster's spontaneous interactions with Pace despite the presence of the film crew surrounding them.

The film features a dream sequence animation created by Christoph Launstein and  Wolfgang Lauenstein.

Filming locations

 Valkenberg Hospital in Cape Town, South Africa
 Deadvlei from the Sossusvlei dune in Namib-Naukluft National Park in Namibia
 The labyrinth Jantar Mantar in Jaipur
 Lake Palace Hotel in Udaipur, India
 Charles Bridge in Prague, Czech Republic
 Butterfly reef NE of Mana Island, Fiji (Coordinates: -17.672339, 177.131704)
 Ubud, Bali Island, Indonesia
 Andaman Islands of India
 Pangong Tso in Ladakh, India
 Buland Darwaza in the palace complex of Fatehpur Sikri, Uttar Pradesh, India 
 Agra
 Magnetic Hill in Ladakh, India
 Moonscape near Lamayuru Monastery in Ladakh, India
 Gunung Kawi, Bali Island, Indonesia
 Chand Baori, a large stepwell in Abhaneri village in the Indian state of Rajasthan
 Jodhpur, the Blue City in Rajasthan
 Umaid Bhawan Palace Lobby, Jodhpur, Rajasthan
 Taj Mahal, India
 Jardín Botánico de Buenos Aires, Argentina
 Jardín Zoológico de Buenos Aires, Argentina
 Teatro Opera Buenos Aires, Argentina
 Capitoline Hill, Colosseum, Roma, Italy
 Hadrian's Villa, Tivoli, Italy
 Hagia Sophia, Istanbul, Turkey
 First Statue of Liberty at Île aux Cygnes in Paris, France

Release
The Fall premiered at the 2006 Toronto International Film Festival. For its theatrical release in 2008, the film was presented by David Fincher and Spike Jonze.

Critical reception
On review aggregator Rotten Tomatoes, the film holds a 62% approval rating based on 112 reviews, with an average rating of 6.30/10. The website's critics consensus reads, "More visually elaborate than the fragmented story can sometimes support, The Fall walks the line between labor of love and filmmaker self-indulgence." Metacritic, which uses a weighted average, assigned the film a score of 64 out of 100 based on 23 critics, indicating "generally favorable reviews".

Roger Ebert of the Chicago Sun-Times gave the film four stars out of four and wrote, "You might want to see [it] for no other reason than because it exists. There will never be another like it." He later named it among his top 20 films of 2008. Nathan Lee of The New York Times, however, wrote that the film "is a genuine labor of love—and a real bore."

The film appeared on several critics' top ten lists of the best films of 2008. Tasha Robinson of The A.V. Club named it the best film of 2008, and Sean Axmaker of the Seattle Post-Intelligencer named it the 6th best film of 2008.

See also
List of films with longest production time

References

External links 
 
 
 
 
 

2006 films
2000s fantasy adventure films
2006 independent films
American independent films
American fantasy adventure films
Indian fantasy adventure films
Magic realism films
Films about filmmaking
Films about stunt performers
Films set in the 1920s
Films set in Los Angeles
Films shot in Indonesia
Films shot in Argentina
Films shot in Nepal
Films shot in Rome
Films directed by Tarsem Singh
Films shot in Buenos Aires
English-language Indian films
Films with screenplays by Dan Gilroy
Films about depression
Indian independent films
2000s English-language films
2000s American films